Callicarpa cana is a species name previously used to describe two different species of beautyberry:
Callicarpa cana  L. is accepted as Callicarpa candicans var. candicans (Burm.f.) Hochr.
Callicarpa cana Gamble is accepted as Callicarpa macrophylla Vahl

References

cana